The Billy is a large scenthound originating from central western France.

Description
A Billy may be pure white, off-white or gray, sometimes with orange or lemon spots on the head and body. The coat is short, smooth and harsh to the touch. Weight is between 72 and 104 lbs and height is 60–70 cm at the shoulder for males and 58–62 cm for females.

The Fédération Cynologique Internationale standard suggests the dog should gallop easily in its movement. The standard for the breed was established in 1885
.

The Billy is not suitable for a small house; needing a lot of exercise and being difficult to restrain and extremely fast.

History and use
The Billy was created by Monsieur Gaston Hublot de Rivault Taco in the 19th century, and was named after his home the Château de Billy, in Poitou. Billys were created by combining the three original strains of the Poitevin, the Montemboeuf, Ceris and Larrye. Whereas the modern Poitevin more closely resembles and the original Tri-coloured Larrye line, Rivault was more drawn to the paler colours associated with the Montemboeuf and Ceris lines, and colouration was a major determinant when selecting foundation stock. The pack was dispersed in 1927 and the breed almost faced extinction, only two hounds survived World War II, however de Rivault's son, Anthony, set about reviving the breed by judicious use of the Poitevin, the Porcelaine and the Harrier.

The Billy was one of the foundation breeds used in the development of the Grand Anglo-Français Blanc et Orange in the late 19th century.

The Billy remains a rare breed, although there are several packs in its native France used to hunt roe deer, and two packs to hunt wild boar.

See also
 Dogs portal
 List of dog breeds
Scenthound
Scenthound Group
Hound

References

Bibliography
 Alderton, David, Hounds of the World, Swan Hill Press, Shrewsbury, 2000, .
 Cunliffe, Juliette, The Encyclopedia of Dog Breeds Parragon, 2001, .
 Federation Cynologique Internationale, Billy, retrieved 12 Dec 14.
 Fogle, Bruce, The Encyclopedia of the Dog, DK Publishing, New York, 2009, .
 Hancock, David, Hounds: Hunting by Scent, The Crowood Press Ltd, Marlborough, 2014, .

FCI breeds
Rare dog breeds
Scent hounds
Dog breeds originating in France